Laurence David Craker (1 March 1953 – 16 May 2020) was an English footballer and manager who played as a midfielder. As a player, Craker played in the Third Division and the Fourth Division with Watford.

Early life
Craker was born in Aylesbury in Buckinghamshire.

Playing career
As a player, Craker started his career at Chelsea, but did not make an appearance for the club and left to join Jewish Guild in 1971, where he played for nine months. He returned to England, joining Watford in 1972. Craker went on to make 66 league appearances for Watford, scoring 4, between 1972 and 1977 in the Third Division and the Fourth Division. He suffered multiple injuries while at Watford, including a broken leg. Towards the end of his spell at Watford, Craker had a three-month loan spell at Dartford.

After leaving Watford, Craker joined Hayes in August 1977, where he made 184 appearances, scoring 8, before being released by the club in August 1981. Following his release by Hayes, Craker played for Staines Town, Chesham United, Maidenhead United, Northwood and Chalfont St Peter.

Managerial career
Craker's first managerial role came when he was offered the manager role at Windsor & Eton in 1984, before later managing Chalfont St Peter across the 1986–87 season. In 1990, he was appointed as assistant manager at Marlow with Dave Russell, and helped guide Marlow to the FA Cup third round in the 1992–93 season, before Craker and Russell moved on to Slough Town. Craker was manager of Walton & Hersham across the 1996–97 season.

In January 1999, Craker became the assistant manager of Chesham United, before becoming their manager in April 1999 following the departure of Alan Cork. He later became the manager of Flackwell Heath in 2000 before resigning in August of the following year. Craker was appointed as a coach at Kingstonian in 2003, before returning to Flackwell Heath as manager in 2004. Craker became assistant manager at Burnham before resigning in 2014.

Personal life
Craker also worked as a thatcher alongside his father.

His son Lewis was also a footballer and played for multiple clubs, including Maidenhead United, and is now manager of Thame Rangers.

Craker died of cancer on 16 May 2020, aged 67.

References

External links
 
 Laurie Craker at Neil Brown Newcastle Fans

1953 births
2020 deaths
English footballers
English football managers
Sportspeople from Aylesbury
Association football midfielders
Deaths from cancer in England
Chelsea F.C. players
Jewish Guild players
Watford F.C. players
Hayes F.C. players
Staines Town F.C. players
Chesham United F.C. players
Maidenhead United F.C. players
Northwood F.C. players
Chalfont St Peter A.F.C. players
English Football League players
Windsor & Eton F.C. managers
Chalfont St Peter A.F.C. managers
Marlow F.C. non-playing staff
Slough Town F.C. non-playing staff
Walton & Hersham F.C. managers
Chesham United F.C. non-playing staff
Chesham United F.C. managers
Flackwell Heath F.C. managers
Burnham F.C. non-playing staff
English expatriate footballers
Expatriate soccer players in South Africa
English expatriate sportspeople in South Africa
Footballers from Buckinghamshire